Soren Anders (born John T. Fischer) is an American composer, singer, record producer and instrumentalist from southern Illinois. He is the creator of the multi-award winning band Shimmerplanet.

Early life 
Anders has said that as a child, he spent a lot of time outdoors, growing things and getting dirty. A bit of a hippy, he subscribed to Organic Gardening magazine when he was eight years old. He spent much of his early years playing the piano and violin, drafting maps of imaginary cities, and escaping into endless hours of TV watching.

At the age of 16, Anders turned off the TV for good, and wrote his first piece, a terribly melancholy instrumental composition for solo piano.

In college, Anders committed himself to the piano, studying under the acclaimed principal pianist for the Chicago Symphony Orchestra, Mary Sauer. Anders possessed a special affinity for terribly melancholy Russian music.

Anders' has performed in many bands most notably Shimmerplanet.

He has taught elementary school music in a dangerous neighborhood, formed an award-winning children's gospel choir, and wrote music for a few plays and films. And, in the middle of all this musical meandering, he moved to New York and created Shimmerplanet.

Career 
Ander's has gained much critical success as the creator of the band Shimmerplanet has been called "a breakthrough creatively" and "brilliant". "It takes artistic courage to be this lyrically honest and musically experimental," wrote Indie-Music.com. Awards from The Songwriters Hall of Fame, The Independent Music Awards, and Talent in Motion Magazine followed.

Anders has worked with 60s recording icon Lesley Gore, 80s recording icon Chris Stein (of Blondie), and recently scored and conducted a choir for one of his favorite bands, Menomena. The recipient of numerous awards, international airplay and critical accolades, Anders is very busy, not just with Shimmerplanet, but with various other collaborations (Darren Ockert, Carolyn Eufrasio, Molly Bea).

References

External links 
 Soren Anders – official site

Living people
21st-century American composers
American multi-instrumentalists
American male singer-songwriters
Singer-songwriters from Illinois
Shark Meat Records artists
American male pianists
21st-century American pianists
21st-century American male musicians
Year of birth missing (living people)